Take 3 for the Sea is a non-profit organisation based on the Central Coast of New South Wales, Australia. In 2009, two friends marine ecologist, Roberta Dixon-Valk and youth educator, Amanda Marechal developed Take 3 – an idea where a simple action could produce profound consequences. Joining forces with environmentalist, Tim Silverwood, the trio publicly launched Take 3 as an organisation in 2010.

Take 3 raises awareness of marine debris, especially plastic, and encourages individuals to take 3 pieces of rubbish before leaving the beach, places near waterways or coastal areas.

In 2011, Take 3 won the Taronga Green Grant: $50,000 offered by the Taronga Foundation from Taronga Zoo.

In July 2011, co-founder  Silverwood went on a research expedition to document the Great Pacific Garbage Patch, also known as North Pacific Gyre or Pacific Trash Vortex.

See also
Marine debris
Plastic particle water pollution

References

External links
 Take 3 Official Website
 Tim Silverwood's Blog
 Interview with Tim Silverwood

Environment of Australia
Organizations established in 2009